The American Journal of Obstetrics and Gynecology (AJOG) is a peer reviewed journal of obstetrics and gynecology.  It is popularly called the "Gray Journal". Since 1920, AJOG has continued the American Journal of Obstetrics and Diseases of Women and Children, which began publishing in 1868. AJOG has been Medline-indexed since 1965. The current editors-in-chief are Catherine Bradley, MD, MSCE & Roberto Romero, MD, DMedSci.

It is the official publication of the following societies and associations:
 American Gynecological and Obstetrical Society
 Association of Professors of Gynecology and Obstetrics
 Central Association of Obstetricians and Gynecologists
 Pacific Coast Obstetrical and Gynecological Society
 Society of Gynecologic Surgeons
 Society for Maternal-Fetal Medicine
 South Atlantic Association of Obstetricians and Gynecologists

The journal also publishes selected papers from the annual meeting of the American Urogynecologic Society.

References

External links 

 Website

Elsevier academic journals
English-language journals
Obstetrics and gynaecology journals
Monthly journals